Galianeh-ye Ali Baqer (also Romanized as Galīāneh-ye ‘Alī Bāqer; also known as Galīāneh, Galyāneh, and Kalīāneh-ye ‘Alī Bāqer) is a village in Jalalvand Rural District, Firuzabad District, Kermanshah County, Kermanshah Province, Iran. At the 2006 census, its population was 516, in 111 families.

References 

Populated places in Kermanshah County